The Škoda Octavia is a small family car produced by the Czech car manufacturer Škoda Auto since the end of 1996. It shares its name with an earlier model produced between 1959 and 1971. Four generations of the modern-era Octavia model have been introduced to date, delivered with five-door liftback or five-door estate styles only. The car is front engined, both front- or four-wheel drive are offered. Around five million units have been sold in its two decades of presence on the market. The Octavia is Škoda's most popular model; about 40% of all newly manufactured Škoda cars are Octavias.

The current generation is available in a wide range of derivatives, i.e. sporty Octavia RS, estate Octavia Combi, four-wheel drive Octavia Scout, frugal Octavia GreenLine and CNG-powered Octavia G-TEC.

First generation (Typ 1U; 1996)

The first generation Octavia was released in November 1996 and was built at the modernised Škoda factory in Mladá Boleslav, Czech Republic. This generation was made available in liftback or estate styles.

In the United Kingdom, sales began in 1998 and the mid-size car was a success, nearing the success of established large family car favourites such as the Ford Mondeo and Vauxhall Vectra.

The first generation Octavia had a facelift in 2000, and was still manufactured and marketed in some markets, even after the second generation was introduced in 2004. In Germany, and other parts of West Europe, as well as Asia, the first generation model was marketed as the Octavia Tour, while the newer model is marketed as the Octavia. In some markets, the first generation Octavia was still known as Octavia, and the newer model was referred to as the new Octavia, Octavia5 (Greece) or Laura (India). First generation Skoda Octavia was discounted in the United Kingdom when second generation was launched in 2004

In India, the Octavia was launched in 2002 and was an instant hit for its frugal engines and solid build. It became a huge success in India, selling 44,900 units.

Revisions to the facelifted model included independent rear suspension and revised interior.

The facelifted Octavia featured a 4x4 wheel drive version both for the estate and more popular liftback models, and used the Haldex Traction clutch, like other Volkswagen Group A platform based cars (Volkswagen Golf Mk4, Audi A3 and SEAT León Cupra R4). It had higher ground clearance and a bigger fuel tank carrying  compared to the  standard front wheel drive versions.

The 4x4 option was only available with the 1.8 T  petrol engine, the 1.9 TDI  diesel engine, or the 2.0 L petrol engine, all coupled with a 5-speed manual gearbox, and with the 1.9 TDI-PD (Pumpe-Düse)  diesel engine which came with a 6-speed manual gearbox.

The other 6-speed manual model was the 1.9 TDI-PD , only available with front-wheel-drive.

The RS (vRS in the UK) was the top-level and quickest specification and used a 1.8-litre straight-4 turbocharged engine which produced . Škoda made a limited number of 100 WRC Replica Cars worldwide in 2002. These differ from normal RS Octavias, as they are produced in white, have rally decals and have additional accessories as standard (such as ESP, xenon lights, heated front seats).

Engines

The engines used are the same as for many other cars in the Volkswagen Group:

Octavia L&K Long (2001)
A special version of the Octavia, lengthened by 8 cm, was produced in 2001 and only intended for government purposes. It was available in the Laurin & Klement trim (which included air conditioning, leather and cruise control among others), but also equipped with other features such as a telephone, reading lights and folding tables. The length was achieved by widening the center pillar, increasing space for the rear seat passengers. 

Supposedly, Škoda delivered only 25 automobiles to the state administration, five of them in the facelifted version. All were hand-built and the factory sold them below the build price.

Second generation (Typ 1Z; 2004)

The second-generation Octavia was introduced in March 2004, based on the Volkswagen Group A5 (PQ35) platform also used by other Volkswagen Group cars, such as the Audi A3 Mk2, Volkswagen Golf Mk5, Volkswagen Jetta Mk5, SEAT León Mk2, etc.

Responsible for the design were Thomas Ingenlath and Peter Wouda. Along with a new internal-combustion engine range, also shared with other models of the Volkswagen Group, body changes included more legroom for rear-seat passengers (a weak point in the original model) and increased ground clearance at front and rear to reduce the risk of grounding on steep ramps or facing kerbs.

In addition to the Czech factories in Mladá Boleslav and Vrchlabi, from 2008, the Octavia has also been produced at a factory in Bratislava, Slovakia, and in Shanghai, China, under the joint venture of Shanghai Volkswagen. In Russia, the Octavia is assembled at the Volkswagen plant in Kaluga.

In India, the second-generation Octavia was marketed as the Laura to distinguish it from the first generation. The car was marketed in a higher-income segment, and was sold alongside the previous-generation Octavia. However, the first generation ended production in India in 2010, and as of 2012, the Laura's price was reduced and was competing in its predecessor's segment.

Two four-wheel-drive versions of the Octavia are made: the 4x4 and the Scout, both featuring a Haldex Traction four-wheel-drive system, based on a computer-controlled clutch centre coupling.

The Scout, announced in 2006, is only available with the estate body style, and has several crossover-style exterior modifications, such as larger bumpers.

In August 2011, a special Škoda Octavia RS hit the world record on the American Bonneville Speedway and became the fastest car in the world with an up to two-litre engine, when it hit .

Engines
Several engine options are available. All engines are inline-four cylinder designs, water-cooled and use multipoint fuel injection. All diesel engines are turbocharged direct injection (TDI) engines.

Trim levels
In the United Kingdom, the Octavia is available in these trim levels: Classic (now called S), Ambiente (now called SE), 4x4 (estate only), Elegance, Laurin & Klement, Scout 4x4 (estate only), and vRS. All models come with four airbags, electric front windows, air conditioning, central locking and antilock braking system. In some markets, including British and Czech, a version aimed to lower fuel consumption called Greenline is also available. As of September 2011, trim levels have been renamed to Active (Classic) and Ambition (Ambiente).

Facelift

A facelifted version was launched in 2009, after being formally unveiled at the 2008 Paris Motor Show.

The modifications of the facelifted version include aesthetic exterior changes, mechanical changes, and interior features. Externally, the designs of the headlights and bumpers were revised. Some changes were made to the range of available engines and manual and automatic gearboxes, with the 1.4 TSI and 1.8 TSI engines and the seven-speed direct-shift gearbox transmission available for the first time. Inside the car, the stereo and steering wheels were revised, along with some of the interior trim.

Third generation (Typ 5E; 2012)

The third-generation Octavia was revealed on 11 December 2012 at the Škoda Museum in Mladá Boleslav. The car began to appear in showrooms in key European markets in February 2013.

Previously, photos of the car covered in light camouflage were released to the media in late October 2012, after other pre-production cars had already been spotted on several occasions during the same month. It was once again spotted, this time without camouflage, on 18 November 2012 in Santiago, Chile, in both liftback and estate body styles, during the filming of a TV advertisement.

The car, designed by Jozef Kabaň, recalls the VisionD concept car presented in 2011. It is also up to 102 kg lighter than the previous model. From May 2013, Octavia customers wishing to carry more can opt for the Combi (estate) version with its  luggage capacity.

The third-generation Octavia is the first Škoda car to feature front radar and a multifunction camera. The radar sensor in the front bumper monitors the area in front of the vehicle and continually evaluates the distance, direction, and speed of all nearby objects (not only traffic). This radar provides data for two assistants in the Octavia: Front Assistant (forward collision warning and emergency braking) and Adaptive Cruise Assistant (adaptive cruise control). A monochromatic fixed-focus multifunction camera is mounted on the windscreen in front of the rear mirror and allows the function of Lane Assistant (lane-keeping system), Intelligent Light Assistant (automatic control of the high beams), and Traffic Sign Recognition (recognises and shows traffic signs on displays of both on-board computer and satellite navigation). Added to this are assists, whose functionality is based on evaluating data provided by ESC or steering sensors: Crew Protect Assistant (proactive passenger protection), and Driver Activity Assistant (fatigue detection).

The Octavia features numerous so-called ‘Simply Clever‘ details, i.e. an ice scraper inside the fuel filler flap, a rubbish bin inside the door panel, a parking ticket holder and a double-sided (rubber/textile) floor mat in the boot. A tilting/sliding panoramic sunroof is available as an option – a single-piece for the Octavia liftback and two-piece for the Octavia Combi. The Bolero, Amundsen, and Columbus car radios are protected against theft by the physical separation of the central display and the multimedia system's own central unit. The Octavia also offers a Phone Box, a storage compartment for a mobile phone with a planar antenna at the bottom of the compartment, which permits a so-called inductive exterior antenna connection.

For the front-wheel drive Octavia, engine outputs are offered of 63–132 kW (86–179 PS) on petrol/gasoline cars and 66–110 kW (90–150 PS) for the diesel engines. The two environmentally friendly versions of the Octavia are: the GreenLine version with 1.6-litre diesel produces only 85 grams of CO2 per km; the G-TEC is fitted with 1.4-litre TSI engine running on CNG and emitting 97 grams of CO2 per km. The all-wheel-drive Octavia Combi can be powered by one petrol (1.8 TSI/132 kW) and three diesel engines (ranging from 77 to 135 kW).

The Octavia RS, available in both the liftback and estate body styles, was premiered at the Goodwood Festival of Speed 2013. It features the 162 kW (220 PS) 2.0 TSI engine from the newly launched Volkswagen Golf GTI and the 135 kW (184 PS) 2.0 TDI engine from the Volkswagen Golf GTD. In comparison with the standard car, the sports Octavia features progressive steering (variable-ratio steering), sports chassis, electronic differential lock (XDS), and so-called ‘Performance Sound Generator‘, that enhances the sporty sound of the engine. The source of sound vibrations is the electromagnetic pulse generator placed in the area under/in front of the windshield. The sound vibrations are spreading into the car's cabin through the body and the windshield. The frequency and intensity of the sound are dependent not only on the profile chosen but also on the engine revolutions, driving speed, and engine load (the throttle pedal position). The generated sound is directed inside the cabin, especially to the front seat area. Škoda used the 2015 Geneva Motor Show to shine the spotlight on its new and more powerful Octavia RS 230. The car has 230 PS (10 PS more than stock) and this helps it shave a tenth off its benchmark sprint time and adds 2 km/h to the car's top speed which increases to 250 km/h (155 mph); it also gets a standard electronic differential in this version and lower, stiffer springs.

In early 2014, Škoda revealed the Scout; it has raised suspension, plastic cladding, and four-wheel drive.

In early 2017, the third-generation facelift Octavia arrived in the showrooms, with the main visible difference being the split front headlights looking like the pre-facelift Mercedes-Benz E-Class (W212).

Engines
Overview of engines available for the third-generation Octavia (A7, Typ 5E) with front-wheel drive, including the RS version.

(*)CNG consumption in m3/100 km. Consumption of 1 m3 of CNG is adequate to 1 L of petrol.

Overview of engines available for the 3rd-generation Octavia Combi 4×4 (A7, Typ 5E) with all-wheel drive, incl. the Scout version.

Facelift
On 10 January 2017 in Vienna, Škoda presented the third-generation Octavia facelift. The main changes brought mainly split front headlights, a solid centre section between the front grille, and a new system for predictive pedestrian protection. Plastic (exterior) side door mouldings were absent on the facelift Scout model. The first cars were delivered to customers before spring. The Chinese version leaked in March 2017 and a totally different taillight design and similar to its bigger counterpart, Škoda Superb.

Fourth generation (NX; 2019)
The fourth-generation Octavia was revealed in Prague on 11 November 2019. It was scheduled to be delivered to customers starting from June 2020.

The fourth generation Octavia features many new technologies. It is the first Škoda model to use a heads-up display. Other new technologies include two 10" displays, wireless smartphone charging, up to 5 USB-C ports, a new Sound System by Canton, and the classic shifting stick for the automatic gearbox has been replaced with a small joystick. New safety features include taking control of steering in case of a possible accident, checking for oncoming vehicles when opening doors, and detection of the driver falling asleep or losing consciousness.

Since June 2020, the Octavia is sold as an estate and liftback with standard petrol and diesel engines. As well as a plug-in hybrid Octavia iV estate and liftback sport Octavia RS estate and liftback, CNG/petrol Octavia G-Tec estate and liftback.

The liftback version was also sold in China since 2021 as the Octavia Pro and sold alongside the third-generation models. Design wise, the Octavia Pro features an identical exterior design with the Octavia RS.

Liftback engines:

Awards 
In January 2021, the Octavia Estate 1.4 TSI iV SE Technology was named Plug-in Hybrid of the Year by What Car? magazine. What Car? awarded the Octavia Estate five stars out of five in its review of the car.

Motorsport
The Škoda Octavia has been used in the European Touring Car Championship, the World Rally Championship and the FIA 2-Litre World Rally Cup.

Notes

References

External links

Octavia
Compact cars
Euro NCAP large family cars
Hatchbacks
Station wagons
Front-wheel-drive vehicles
All-wheel-drive vehicles
Touring cars
Cars of the Czech Republic
Cars introduced in 1996
2000s cars
2010s cars
Taxi vehicles
Police vehicles